Joe Medford was born on April 2, 1932 and died on November 16, 1993. From Clyde, North Carolina, he was a well-known banjo player, playing with some of the early artists of bluegrass music. Groups and musicians he played with include the Murphy Brothers and the Blue River Boys, Mac Wiseman and Charlie Monroe & his Kentucky Partners.

Recordings
A selection of the recordings on which Joe Medford played.  Some of these are CD re-releases of old recordings in other formats:
 Early Bluegrass Recordings of the Murphy Brothers, Cattle Records
 Original Blue River Boys, Cattle Records
 I'm Old Kentucky Bound, Charlie Monroe, Bear Family Records, 2007
 Dim Lights, Thick Smoke and Hillbilly Music - Country & Western Hit Parade 1951, various artists, 2009
 Raw Fiddle, various artists, 2004
 'Tis Sweet to Be Remembered: Complete Recordings 1951-1964, Mac Wiseman, 2003
 First Generation Blue Grass, Various Artists, 2002

References

External links
  - Medford plays banjo with Fred Murphy in this old 78.
  - Medford recorded this with Mac Wiseman back in May 1951.

1932 births
1993 deaths
Bluegrass musicians from North Carolina
American country banjoists
People from Clyde, North Carolina
20th-century American musicians
Country musicians from North Carolina